Mahmoud El-Metwalli Mohamed Mansour (born 4 January 1993), commonly known as Mahmoud Metwalli, is an Egyptian footballer who plays for Al Ahly in the Egyptian Premier League as a midfielder and centre back.

Career statistics

Club

Honours
Al Ahly
 Egyptian Premier League: 2019–20
 Egypt Cup: 2019–20
 Egyptian Super Cup: 2018, 2021
 CAF Champions League: 2019–20

Egypt U20
 African U-20 Championship: 2013

References

Egyptian footballers
Ismaily SC players
Egyptian Premier League players
1993 births
Living people
Association football midfielders